Jimmy Jordan (born February 11, 1958) is a former American football quarterback in the United States Football League (USFL). He played for the Tampa Bay Bandits. He was drafted by the New England Patriots in the 12th round of the 1980 NFL Draft, but was released and never played in any games with the team. Jordan played college football at Florida State.

Jordan was inducted into Florida State's Hall of Fame in 1985.

References

1958 births
Living people
American football quarterbacks
Florida State Seminoles football players
Tampa Bay Bandits players